Millie DeLeon (circa 1873 – August 6, 1922) was the stage name of American burlesque dancer Millie Lawrence. She is listed in some records as "Elizabeth," "Maud" and "Maude".

Biography
DeLeon was known as "The Girl in Blue" and was notorious for manipulating the media through the artful use of scandal. She has been called "The first real queen of American Burlesque" As a performer she traveled across America, often testing the limits of local indecency ordinances. Her signature stage maneuver was to remove her garters and throw them into the audience.

Marriage and children
DeLeon married manager Lew Rose. The marriage record lists the spouse name at Louis Rosentamm and the marriage date as February 27, 1907.

She had a daughter (November 13, 1898 – ), Pamela Lawrence, a vaudeville performer

References

Further reading
Irving Zeidman The American Burlesque Show, Hawthorne Books, New York,  1967
Rachel Shteir Striptease, The Untold History of the Girlie Show, Oxford University Press 2004

1870s births
1922 deaths
American burlesque performers